The straddle technique was the dominant style in the high jump before the development of the Fosbury Flop. It is a successor of the Western roll, with which it is sometimes confused.

Unlike the scissors or flop style of jump, where the jumper approaches the bar so as to take off from the outer foot, the straddle jumper approaches from the opposite side, so as to take off from the inner foot. In this respect the straddle resembles the western roll. However, in the western roll the jumper's side or back faces the bar; in the straddle the jumper crosses the bar face down, with legs straddling it. With this clearance position, the straddle has a mechanical advantage over the western roll, since it is possible to clear a bar that is higher relative to the jumper's center of mass. In simple terms, the western roll jumper has to raise the width of the body above the bar; the straddle jumper has only to get the thickness of the body above it.

There are two variants of the straddle: the parallel straddle and a more diving version. With the parallel straddle, the lead leg is kicked high and straight, and head and trunk pass the bar at the same time. Charles Dumas, the first high jumper to clear , and John Thomas (silver medalist at the 1964 Summer Olympics) used this technique. Valeriy Brumel (gold in 1964) dived, his head going over the bar before his trunk. Probably the most extreme exponent of the dive straddle was Bob Avant, who cleared  in 1961. Avant's technique was close to a pure dive, with just a small knee lift on his lead leg.

This style spread quickly, and soon "floppers" became dominant in high jump competitions.

The last world record jump with the straddle technique was Vladimir Yashchenko's  in 1978. (His best result was  obtained in Milan at the 1978 European Athletics Indoor Championships). He was only 19 years old when he set the record, but a knee injury effectively ended his career the next year. Yashchenko's record was improved upon in 1980 by a flopper, Jacek Wszola of Poland, who had already won the 1976 Montréal Olympics.

Her record was surpassed by her long-term rival, the Italian flopper Sara Simeoni, by 1 cm in 1978. Ackermann was also the gold medalist of the 1976 Montréal Olympics, which was the last time for a straddle jumper (male or female) to win an Olympic medal.

After Yashchenko and Ackermann, all world record holders and Olympics medalists in high jump have used the flop style.

There is some debate over which of the two techniques is more efficient in the take-off and the clearance of the bar. Although both have advantages and disadvantages, the Fosbury flop is considered by many easier to learn, especially for younger jumpers, and thus has become the dominant technique.

In 1993, an American high jumper Steve Harkins brought back the straddle style in the Master's division, beating a 'flopper' at the World Championships in Miyazaki Japan. Harkins used the 'head down first' style as did Brumel. At  at the U.S. National Championships in Bozeman, Montana; in March 1993, Harkins was the tallest jumper ever in the Master's to have used the straddle style. The last significant user of the style was East German Decathlete, Christian Schenk, who retired in 1994. He cleared  in the 1988 Seoul Olympics where he claimed a gold medal, and this is still the Olympic Decathlete Best in high jump.

References

External links
High Jump - Introduction at IAAF web site

High jump
Sport of athletics terminology